Rescinnamine, known by the brand names moderil, cinnasil, and anaprel, is an angiotensin-converting enzyme inhibitor used as an antihypertensive drug.  

It is a vinca alkaloid obtained from Rauvolfia serpentina and other species of Rauvolfia.

References 

Indoloquinolizines
Tryptamine alkaloids
Isoquinoline alkaloids
ACE inhibitors
Antihypertensive agents
Alkaloids found in Rauvolfia
Pyrogallol ethers
Cinnamate esters
Indole ethers at the benzene ring